Introducing Eddy and the Falcons is the second album by the English rock band Wizzard. It peaked at No. 19 in the UK Albums Chart – ten places higher than its predecessor, Wizzard Brew. As with the previous Wizzard album, all songs were composed by Roy Wood.

History
The album had a concept similar to The Beatles' Sgt. Pepper's Lonely Hearts Club Band, in that the intro 'featured' the appearance on stage of fictional band Eddy & The Falcons. All tracks were written and recorded as tributes to 1950s and early 1960s rock and roll musicians, "Eddy’s Rock" being a guitar and saxophone instrumental played in the style of Duane Eddy, while "Everyday I Wonder" was similar in sound and approach to Del Shannon's "Runaway", and "Come Back Karen" did the same for Neil Sedaka's "Oh! Carol". A particularly clear tribute was to Elvis Presley in "I Dun Lotsa Cryin' Over You".

One single was released from the album, "This Is the Story of My Love (Baby)". Its chart performance in the UK Singles Chart (No. 34) was a disappointment, as all Wizzard's previous singles had reached the top 10.

The album was initially meant to be half of a double album by the group, with the other half in a more progressive or experimental jazz-rock style. However, the record label heard the work in progress, and asked for the rock and roll part to be recorded and released as a single album.

The sleeve featured a credit 'Custard pies - D.L.T.' This referred to one of their appearances on Top of the Pops, when presenter Dave Lee Travis had been the apparently unwitting recipient of a custard pie wielded by one of the group.

The jazz-rock material was recorded later but not released until 2000, on the album Main Street – some 25 years after Wizzard had disbanded.

The original release of Introducing Eddy and the Falcons on the Warner Bros. label, in a gate-fold sleeve, included a fold-out poster of Roy Wood on stage. It was reissued by Edsel on CD in 1999, featuring bonus tracks (1974 singles, A-side and B-sides, which had not been recorded as part of the original concept), but was soon deleted.

Track listing
All songs written by Roy Wood except where noted.

Side one
"Intro" – 0:45
"Eddy's Rock" – 3:56
"Brand New 88" – 3:21
"You Got Me Runnin' " – 3:15
"I Dun Lotsa Cryin' Over You" – 3:22
"This Is the Story of My Love (Baby)" – 4:45

Side two
"Everyday I Wonder" – 4:56
"Crazy Jeans" – 2:48
"Come Back Karen" – 3:05
"We're Gonna Rock 'n' Roll Tonight" – 5:06

Personnel
Roy Wood – vocals, guitars, drums, oboe, cello, bass, keyboards, bassoon, string bass, tenor and baritone saxes, percussion
Rick Price – bass guitar, guitar, vocals, percussion
Nick Pentelow – tenor saxophone
Mike Burney – tenor and baritone saxes
Keith Smart – drums
Charlie Grima – percussion
Bill Hunt – piano
Bob Brady – piano and vocals (on final track) and 'incidental boogies'.

Certifications

References

1974 albums
Wizzard albums
Albums produced by Roy Wood
Warner Records albums
United Artists Records albums